Glebe Church (also known as Bennett's Creek Church) is a historic Anglican church in Driver, Virginia and its surrounding glebe. The church was built in 1737–1738, and is a rectangular, gable-roofed, brick church measuring 48 feet, 6 inches, by 25 feet, 4 inches.  It was added to the National Register of Historic Places in 1973.

References

External links
Official church website

18th-century Episcopal church buildings
Episcopal churches in Virginia
Churches in Suffolk, Virginia
Churches completed in 1738
Churches on the National Register of Historic Places in Virginia
National Register of Historic Places in Suffolk, Virginia